Linda Mary Fraser (born 30 October 1953) is a New Zealand former cricketer who played as a left-arm medium bowler. She appeared in 3 Test matches and 13 One Day Internationals for New Zealand between 1982 and 1987. She played domestic cricket for Auckland, Central Districts, Wellington and North Shore.

References

External links

1953 births
Living people
Cricketers from Napier, New Zealand
New Zealand women cricketers
New Zealand women Test cricketers
New Zealand women One Day International cricketers
Auckland Hearts cricketers
Central Districts Hinds cricketers
Wellington Blaze cricketers
North Shore women cricketers